Elizabeth of Austria (9 July 1526 – 15 June 1545) was Queen of Poland by marriage. She was the eldest of fifteen children of Ferdinand I, Holy Roman Emperor, and his wife Anne of Bohemia and Hungary. A member of the House of Habsburg, she was married to Sigismund II Augustus, who was already crowned as King of Poland and Grand Duke of Lithuania even though both of his parents were still alive and well. The marriage was short and unhappy. Elizabeth was of frail health, experiencing epileptic seizures, and died at age 18.

Marriage plans 

Elizabeth spent most of her childhood in the Hofburg, Innsbruck. She was raised with strict discipline and received a good education from humanist Kaspar Ursinus Velius, but was not taught the Polish language despite her early arranged marriage to Sigismund II Augustus. The marriage plan was first discussed when Elizabeth was only a one year old. Louis, King of Hungary and Bohemia, died in August 1526 without leaving an heir. The Hungarian throne was contested between Louis' brother-in-law Ferdinand I and John Zápolya. Louis' uncle Sigismund I the Old and Hungarian nobility supported Zápolya. The marriage of Elizabeth to Sigismund's son was proposed as the means to end Polish support to Zápolya. The Polish Queen Bona Sforza opposed the wedding as she opposed the growing influence of the Habsburgs.

In February 1530, ten-year-old Sigismund II Augustus was co-crowned vivente rege as King of Poland (his father was still alive and in good health) to secure his inheritance in Poland. Envoys of George, Duke of Saxony, attended the coronation ceremony and negotiated the marriage between Elizabeth and Sigismund August on behalf of Ferdinand. Great Chancellor of the Crown Krzysztof Szydłowiecki supported the match and organized a preliminary marriage treaty, signed on 10–11 November 1530 in Poznań. According to the treaty, the marriage was to take place in 1533 when Elizabeth reached the age of seven. Her dowry was 100,000 ducats. In exchange, the Poles would grant her the cities of Nowy Sącz, Sanok, Przemyśl, Biecz as her dower.

Sigismund Augustus and Elizabeth were first cousins once removed. (Casimir IV Jagiellon was a great-grandfather of Elizabeth and a grandfather of Sigismund August). This close relationship required a matrimonial dispensation, which was issued by Pope Clement VII on 24 August 1531. The final marriage treaty, delayed mostly due to the opposition by Bona Sforza, was signed only on 16 June 1538 in Breslau (now Wrocław) by Johannes Dantiscus. The treaty did not differ from the preliminary treaty of 1530 other than the age of the bride which was now set at 16. The betrothal ceremony took place on 17 July 1538 in Innsbruck. Bona continued to lobby against the marriage and instead proposed Princess Margaret of France.

Queen of Poland 
Elizabeth and a twelve-person escort departed Vienna on 21 April 1543. She was met at Olomouc by Samuel Maciejowski, Bishop of Płock and a retinue of 1,500 knights. On 5 May 1543, Elizabeth entered Kraków and met Sigismund Augustus for the first time. The same day 16-year-old Elizabeth married 22-year-old Sigismund Augustus in Wawel Cathedral. The wedding celebrations continued for two weeks. She was also crowned as Queen of Poland, which only increased the ire of Bona Sforza, who detested her title of "Old Queen".

The marriage was not a happy one. Sigismund Augustus, who already had several mistresses, did not find Elizabeth attractive and continued to have extramarital affairs. Raised in a strict household to be obedient, Elizabeth was too timid and meek to object to this. A long journey from Austria to Poland had further deteriorated her already frail state of health. She was diagnosed with epilepsy and started having seizures. At the same time Bona openly expressed her dislike of Elizabeth and continued to search for ways to destroy the marriage. Bona questioned the wording of the matrimonial dispensation; a new dispensation was issued on 17 May 1544. On the other hand, Polish nobility liked and sympathized with Elizabeth – a young, pleasant woman who was ignored by her husband and taunted by her ambitious mother-in-law. Her father-in-law Sigismund I the Old was also sympathetic to her, but was too weak to protect her from Bona.

Two months after the wedding, plague reached Kraków and the royal family departed the capital city. Sigismund Augustus left for the Grand Duchy of Lithuania, while Sigismund I the Old, Bona, and Elizabeth toured various cities in Poland. After a year of separation, the couple met again in Brest. Sigismund Augustus liked living independently in Lithuania and convinced his father to entrust him with ruling the Grand Duchy. In fall 1544, Elizabeth and Sigismund Augustus moved to Vilnius. For a few months Sigismund Augustus attempted to keep up appearances of a successful marriage to appease the Habsburgs, but soon started ignoring his wife and continued his affair with Barbara Radziwiłł.

In April 1545, Elizabeth's health deteriorated and she was tormented by her increasingly frequent seizures. On 8 June 1545, Sigismund Augustus went to Kraków to receive Elizabeth's dowry, leaving his wife alone in Vilnius. In Kraków, Sigismund Augustus inquired about treatments and asked Ferdinand I to send his own doctors. But it was too late. On 15 June, the young queen died exhausted by her many epileptic seizures. She was buried on 24 July 1545 (after her husband returned from Kraków) in Vilnius Cathedral next to her husband's uncle, King Alexander Jagiellon.

After Elizabeth's death Sigismund Augustus married his mistress Barbara Radziwiłł and, after her death, Elizabeth's younger sister, Catherine of Austria. Sigismund had no children with any his three wives.

Ancestors

References

Notes

Bibliography

External links
Przemysław Jędrzejewski, ELŻBIETA AUSTRIACZKA – KRÓLOWA POLSKA I WIELKA KSIĘŻNA LITEWSKA (1526–1545)

1526 births
1545 deaths
Burials at Vilnius Cathedral
Wives of Sigismund II Augustus
16th-century House of Habsburg
16th-century Austrian women
Neurological disease deaths in Lithuania
Deaths from epilepsy
Royalty and nobility with disabilities
Daughters of emperors
Children of Ferdinand I, Holy Roman Emperor
Daughters of kings
People from Innsbruck
People from Linz
Austrian people with disabilities